A lombard, also known as a lonbarda, wallbreaker, or quebrantamuro, was a smoothbore cannon used in the early Renaissance in Spain and Italy. Its ammunition consisted of 70 to 90 pounds (30-40 kgs) balls.

A lombard was used as an alarm to alert Christopher Columbus on the first of his voyages that land – what is now known as the Bahamas – had been sighted.

References

Artillery of Spain
Artillery of Italy
Early firearms
Cannon